Sympulse is an annual international college cultural festival at Symbiosis Centre for Management Studies (SCMS) Pune, founded in 2010. It spreads across a span of five days held in the first quarter of every year. It attracts students from junior, under-graduate and post-graduate colleges as participants. It is an exposure into different categories of talent, for example: Business and Management, Model United Nation Conference, Showcasing artistic ability in cultural extravaganzas, and Sports. These categories have been personalized to suit the fest and the events take place simultaneously over those five days.

Each year has a new theme. Previous themes have been: City Beats, Medieval Mayhem, Theatre of Transition, Spirit of Celebration, Element Entourage, Escape to Neverland, Chrono Drift, Local Coalesce, Elemental Entourage, and Cinematic Odyssey. The Theme for 2020 was Cultural Medley.

Symbiosis Centre for Management Studies, Pune
Symbiosis Centre for Management Studies – a constituent unit of Symbiosis International University was formerly introduced as Symbiosis BBA on 12 July 2004 in Pune. The institute is ranked among the top BBA courses in the nation under the guidance of Dr. Bhama Venkataramani. About 6000 students apply for 240 seats annually.

The 5 wings of Sympulse
In 2010, SCMS-UG held four separate college fests with different objectives: Ananya, Sprint, SIMUNC and Symulate. Ananya was focused on cultural activities, Sprint was focused on sport-related activities, SIMUNC was focused on global topics and Symulate was focused on business-related activities. In 2010 the student council decided to merge them and create a single, larger fest called Sympulse. These four fests became wings of Sympulse, and their events were held simultaneously across the five days. Over time, Sympulse grew into five distinct wings (Ananya, Symulate, Sprint, Headline Events, and SIMUNC).

Ananya
Ananya is the cultural wing which encourages creativity and artistic expression through the events it hosts. It's also the largest cultural fest in Pune. It is known to be the living embodiment of a fun element of Sympulse because it plays host to various cultural art forms and ideas. 
The list of categories it covers is given below:
 Literary arts
 Fine arts
 Performing arts
 Showcase events
 Gaming
 Workshops
 Informals
 On the spot events

The events held within each category are not standardized, therefore each year the committee has new events to suit the theme of Sympulse along with previously successful events.

Headline Events
Headline Events is the glamour wing of Sympulse. It is often compared to the gilded world of movies and music, as it showcases the best lofty elements of its participants. They host events like:
 Pit stop: A show case of international cars and bikes from all over Maharashtra. These automobiles are showcased in the college campus.
 Battle of the bands (BOTB): BOTB showcase nationally renowned bands like demonic resurrection, family cheese and workshop.
 War of the DJ: The participant DJs play what they have to offer, competing with each other and the crowd enjoys and judges the best mixes.
 Pronite: A celebration the Indian cinema and music. 
 Texas Hold’em: Where poker is played like a sport.

SIMUNC
SIMUNC, the Symbiosis International Model United Nation Conference, is a personalized version of Model United Nations. SIMUNC compels students to act responsibly, think critically, and make wise decisions It is, in essence, a simulation of the UN and its committees, with contemporary, historical, and, frequently, futuristic perspectives. Students are given an opportunity to converge from all over the world in a dynamic environment to deliberate on global issues, acting as delegates representing the various member states of the UN.

Sprint
Sprint is the sport wing of Sympulse. It was one of the four initial wings of Sympulse, and generally has the highest participation of all wings. The events are categorized into the following sports:
 Basketball
 Football
 Street football
 Boxing
 Badminton
 Table tennis
 And a lot more

Symulate
Symulate is the business and management wing of Sympulse. Symulate begins with the ‘academic summit’, where eminent personalities from different sectors like corporate, sports, media and politics come together to enlighten students on a pre-decided topic. This is followed by events which test the participants' knowledge with management and other business-related activities. It gives participants a common platform to compete and showcase their talents in events ranging from Finance and Human Resource to a variety of team events. It accommodates participants from various colleges for a span of five days where every college contingent battles for the top spot. The events held by Symulate are:
 Best Manager
 Finance
 Best Entrepreneur
 Marketing
 Human Resources
 Business Plan
 Business Quiz
 Strategy

Through the years

Sympulse10===
This was the first year when Sympulse was held. The theme was City Beats. The 4 initial wings of Sympulse – Ananya, Sprint, SIMUNC, and Symulate – embraced the theme and created events within each category to suit the theme. With City Beats as its theme, it aimed to celebrate the epitome of human civilization, the manifestation of man's very soul, and the pinnacle of ambitious vision: a City.
There were 30 international participants and 800 international participants; hence a total of 830 participants. The media coverage was by Channel V and Pune Mirror. The total value of the fest was 4,000,000 INR. 
The footfall for the year was approximately 22,000 guests.

====Celebrities Sympulse'''10====

 
 Abraxas 
 Amey Date 
 Hemant Kaul
 Hormuz Ragina 
 Neeta Lulla
 Poppy Jabal
 Praniti Shinde 
 Pullela Gopichand
 Ritesh Deshmukh
 Tarla Dalal
 VJ Andy of Channel V.

===Sympulse11===
In 2011, Sympulse was held from 17 to 21 January. This year there was an addition of the fifth wing: Headlines. The theme for this year was Medius Tempus Insania also known as Medieval Mayhem. 
The fest had 44 events spread out across the span of five days. There were 54 international participants, 1232 national participants; hence, 1276 participants in total. The media coverage was done by MTV, Pune Mirror, and Mid-Day. The value of the fest was 4,800,000 INR.
The festival recorded an approximate footfall of 24,000 people during the five days.
In addition to the Sympulse buzz, there was a movie shot on campus during the fest. However, the highlight was the performance by Shankar Mahadevan and his troupe – that saw an audience of approximately 2000 people.

====Celebrities Sympulse11====

 
 Angad Bedi
 Arjun Bajwa
 Ashley Lobo
 Shankar Mahadevan
 Jacky Bhagnani
 Kailash Kher
 Puja Gupta
 Remo D’souza
 Tochi Raina 
 Vashu Bhagnani
 Wendell Rodricks
 Salman Khan

===Sympulse12===
In 2012, Sympulse was held on 30 – 3 February. This was the third year of the fest. The theme was Theatre of Transition, it was inspired by the changes in society. It was symbolic of developments in ideologies of people and how that brought about transitions in the lives of individuals which then contributed to the revolution of society over the past few decades. 
There were 60 international participants and 2200 domestic participants; hence in total 2260 participants. The media coverage was done by Gulf News, Mid-Day, and Pune Mirror. The total value of the fest was 7,480,640 INR. 
Sympulse’12 recorded a footfall of 28,274. 
Some of the major attractions of the festival this year were the Pit Stop bikes and cars, the Battle of the Bands, the Fashion Show, and the Musical Nite concert by Pentagram.

====Celebrities Sympulse'''12====

 
 Band of Boys
 Javed Jaffrey
 Kailash Kher
 Madhur Bhandarkar
 Manoviraj Khosla
 Mugdha Godse
 Nargis Fakhri
 Nikhil Chinnappa
 Ranbir Kapoor
 Shriya Saran

===Sympulse13===
In its fourth year, 2013, Sympulse was held from 28 January – 1 February. The theme for the year was The Spirit of Celebration. It intended to celebrate all aspects of life. 
There were 72 international participants and 3000 domestic participants; hence 3072 participants in total. The Media coverage was by 9XO/9XM, Mid-Day, Radio One, DSN, and Extentia. The total value of the fest was 11,300,000 INR. 
The approximate footfall of the fest was 35,000. 
The highlight of the fest was the Musical Nite with Michael Woods and the ProNite with RDB and Akshay Kumar.

====Celebrities Sympulse13=

 
 Akshay Kumar 
 Kajal Aggarwal
 Dualist Inquiry 
 Master Marzi 
 Michael Woods 
 RDB 
 Shivamani 
 Terence Lewis

Sympulse'''14 ===

In its fifth year, Sympulse was held 28 January – 1 February 2014. "Escape to Neverland" was the theme of the fifth edition of this cultural extravaganza. It represented the abstract idea and out of the box thinking that Sympulse stood for. The Media coverage was done by 9XM/9XO, Radio One, Extentia, Autocar India, Mid Day, and Sakal times. The total value of the fest was Rs. 120 lakh with the approximate footfall of the fest being 40,000. The highlight of the fest was the Musical Nite with Dubvision and Nikhil Chinnappa, and the ProNite with Benny Dayal and Bombay Rockers.

==== Celebrity quotient ====
 
 Randeep Hooda,
 Benny Dayal,
 Tom Alter,
 Dubvision,
 Nikhil Chinnappa
 Bombay Rockers

=== Sympulse'15 ===

2015 witnessed Sympulse ’15 from 28 January – 1 February. Entering into its sixth year Sympulse took up "Chrono Drift" as the theme as it found inspiration from the changing tides of time. It was symbolic of the perpetual changes in the society and the ideologies of people and how that brought about transitions in the lives of individuals over time. There were 650 international participants and 4200 domestic participants; hence in total 4850 participants. The media coverage was done by VH1, Radio Mirchi, and Pune Mirror. The total value of the fest was Rs. 40 lakh. Sympulse ’15 had a record footfall of 45,000.

==== Celebrity Quotient ====
 
 Vijendra Singh: Boxing (Sprint)
 Mithoon: Western solo (Ananya).
 Ashmeet Patel: Drama event (Ananya)
 Purab Kholi, Amyara Dastur and Arya Babbar: Fashion show (Ananya)
 Shakti Mohon (Dancer): Solo Dance (Ananya)
 Indian Ocean

=== Sympulse’16 ===
Sympulse’16 was conducted from 20 to 24 January and was a rousing success. The theme of this edition was ‘Realm: The Rebirth,’ where all participants were treated to an enchanting and enthusiastic exhibition of creativity. The five day event included events from a wide variety of domains, including literature, business, sports, music, stage performance and much more.

=== Sympulse’17 ===
The theme for the 2017 edition of Sympulse was held from 18 to 22 January with the theme ‘Local Coalescence’. The theme represents the melding together of different cultures in India to create one beautiful, local community. The 5 day long event included a wide variety of extremely enthralling events such as street plays, concerts and competitions that truly personified the theme.

=== Sympulse’18 ===
Sympulse’18 was conducted from 17 to 22 January and the theme was ‘An Elemental Entourage.’ The five day event consisted of various events such as business competitions, performing arts exhibitions, sports and much more related to the 5 elements; fire, water, earth, air and cosmos. The participants were treated to an exhilarating experience that featured fashion shows, musical performances, food stalls and the excitement of the organizing committee.

=== Sympulse'19 ===
Sympulse’19 was a five-day cultural extravaganza that took place from 15 to 18 January 2020. The theme this year was Cinematic Odyssey, and events were based on movies and TV Shows.

==== Celebrity Quotient ====
 
 Kiran Bedi 
 Biswa Kalyan Rath
 Kaneez Surka
 Varun Thakur 
 Gurbaxx
 The Yellow Diary 
 aswekeepsearching
 Ayesha Takia
 Suresh Menon 
 Parul Gulati 
 Su real

=== Sympulse’20 ===
In 2020, Sympulse was held from 15 to 28 January, and the theme was ‘Cultural Medley.’ The theme was truly representative of Sympulse’s unflattering and never-ending encouragement of inclusivity and diversity. The fest consisted of a wide array of spectacular events such as photography competitions, treasure hunts, sports competitions, mono-acting, street dances and much more which featured web influencers, amazing performances and much more.

=== Sympulse’21 ===
Sympulse’21 was held from 14 to 17 May, and was the first edition of Sympulse to take place virtually. Audience members and participants tuned in virtually through virtual conferences and live streams. The theme for Sympulse’21 was ‘A Global Canvas’ which was truly personified by the massive numbers of participants, audience members and guest celebrities tuning in from all over the world. Events such as business competitions, hilarious games of taboo, graphic design contests, physical strength competitions and much more.

=== Sponsors===

Shirke Group
Dainik Jagran News
Havenspire
Imperial Overseas Educational Consultants
Pokerstars
Suhana
The Great Punjab
High Tournaments
Manikchand
Cocoa Melts
Paytm Insider
StuCred 
Amplogic Audio
Abhishek Mantri
Micro-Star International
Baked For You
Barrel Beans
Body First Wellness
Brew House Tea
Campus Times Pune
DU Express
The Funky Bunny
Kaploths

=== Celebrity Quotient ===

Aishwarya Mohanraj
Aakash Gupta
Mostly Sane (Prajakta Koli)
Sakshi Malik
Sandeep Singh
Neville Shah
Rohan Shah
Shruti Pathak
Venkat Subramaniyam
Anupria Goenka
Kunal More
Prince Nagpal  
Kakoli Gaur
Abhishek Mantri
Siana Catherine
Sandeep Singh
Maadhyam (Mayank Maurya)
Atit Mehta
Lovely Sharma
Pankaj Prajapati
Muhfaad
Anushka Sharma
Sunadda Damrongmanee
Ishan Khedkar
Aneesha Dalal
Shreya Mehta
Medha Srivastava

==Management==Sympulse is an entirely student-run college festival. There are 18 departments which co-ordinate and manage the fest by sharing responsibility of operations. The objectives are monitored by one or two Heads of Department (HOD). The HODs report to a seven-person executive team, which in turn reports to the Vice President and President of Sympulse. The President is then liable to keep the Faculty in-charge updated and well informed. The entire organizing committee consists of approximately 400 people.

===Departments of Sympulse''

References

Cultural festivals in India